This is a complete list of 4K Ultra High Definition (UHD) channels in India.

Channels

UHD Channels in  Jio TV+ (on JioFiber STB)

UHD Channels in Tata Play Binge Plus STB

References

4K
4K television channels